Two-time defending champion Novak Djokovic won the singles tennis title at the 2014 ATP Finals after Roger Federer withdrew from the final. It marked the first walkover in a final in the 45-year history of the tournament. It was Djokovic's fourth Tour Finals title.

Kei Nishikori, Milos Raonic and Marin Čilić made their debuts at the event.

Seeds

 Novak Djokovic (champion)
 Roger Federer (final, withdrew due to back injury)
 Stan Wawrinka (semifinals)
 Kei Nishikori (semifinals)

 Andy Murray (round robin)
 Tomáš Berdych (round robin)
 Milos Raonic (round robin, withdrew because of a thigh injury)
 Marin Čilić (round robin)

Alternates

Draw

Finals
{{4TeamBracket-Tennis3
|RD1=Semifinals
|RD2=Final
|team-width=175
|RD1-seed1=1
|RD1-team1=
|RD1-score1-1=6
|RD1-score1-2=3
|RD1-score1-3=6
|RD1-seed2=4
|RD1-team2=
|RD1-score2-1=1
|RD1-score2-2=6
|RD1-score2-3=0

|RD1-seed3=2
|RD1-team3=
|RD1-score3-1=4
|RD1-score3-2=7
|RD1-score3-3=78
|RD1-seed4=3
|RD1-team4=
|RD1-score4-1=6
|RD1-score4-2=5
|RD1-score4-3=66|RD2-seed1=1
|RD2-team1= Novak Djokovic|RD2-score1-1=w/o'|RD2-score1-2=
|RD2-score1-3=
|RD2-seed2=2
|RD2-team2= Roger Federer
|RD2-score2-1=
|RD2-score2-2=
|RD2-score2-3=
}}

Group A

Group BStandings are determined by: 1. number of wins; 2. number of matches; 3. in two-player ties, head-to-head records; 4. in three-player ties, percentage of sets won, or of games won, then head-to-head records; 5) ATP rankings.''

References

External Links
Main Draw

2014 ATP World Tour Finals